Fardabad is a village in Bancharampur Upazila, Brahmanbaria District, Bangladesh. It is situated along the Titas River. According to the census of 2011, the population of the village was 10,381. The village of Fardabad is the second largest settlement in Fardabad Union which had a total population of 21,952.

See also
 List of villages in Bangladesh

References

Villages in Brahmanbaria District
Villages in Chittagong District